Eugene Barker McDaniel (born 27 September 1931) is a retired United States Navy captain, Naval Aviator and a prisoner of war during the Vietnam War. He was released from captivity on 4 March 1973 after six years of confinement.

Background 
McDaniel was born in September 1931 to Willard and Helen McDaniel, poor tobacco sharecroppers in North Carolina. He was the eldest of eight children. In High School, he was heavily involved in athletics and played basketball and baseball. He had an offer to play baseball professionally, but his father insisted that McDaniel attend college, having only finished 4th grade himself. McDaniel attended Campbell Junior College in Buies Creek, North Carolina on an athletic scholarship. He met his wife Dorothy Howard, the daughter of a Baptist minister, at Campbell and married her six years later. Following Campbell, McDaniel attended Elon College in Elon, North Carolina and enlisted in the Navy. He became interested in aviation since he felt it complemented his athletic mindset. He attended flight school in Corpus Christi, Texas then moved to Virginia Beach, Virginia. He had three children with Dorothy prior to his capture in Vietnam, Mike, David and Leslie.

Navy career 
McDaniel began US Navy active duty 15 March 1955 and was designated a Naval Aviator 1 October 1956 after completing training. From 1956 to 1960, he was a Special Weapons Delivery Instructor with VA-25 and VA-65, which was equipped with the Douglas A-1 Skyraider at the time. From 1961 to 1963, he was a Replacement Air Group (RAG) Flight Instructor with VA-42.

McDaniel deployed on a combat tour to Vietnam as Maintenance Officer with VA-35 aboard  starting in November 1966. He flew 81 combat missions up to May 1967. McDaniel was shot down while flying an A-6A Intruder aircraft (buno 152594) on 19 May 1967 during an Alpha strike on Văn Điển, south of Hanoi, in North Vietnam during Operation Rolling Thunder. He was listed as "missing in action" until the Hanoi government acknowledged that he was being held prisoner in 1970. His bombardier-navigator, James Kelly Patterson, also ejected from the A-6, but as of 2014, it was presumed that Patterson was captured and died at some point later.

McDaniel was tortured while in captivity during the Vietnam War. The most severe torture resulted from his active role in camp communications during an organized escape attempt by his fellow prisoners in June 1969. During that time McDaniel was detained in isolation for more than two weeks, severely beaten, bound with ropes resulting in a compound fracture of his arm, deprived of sleep and subjected to electrical shock. Even though he was not directly involved in planning the escape attempt, he refused to give his torturers the names of the organizers and accepted responsibility for the attempt himself. He is the author of Scars and Stripes, a book telling about his six years of captivity in North Vietnam, with much of it in Hỏa Lò Prison, known as the Hanoi Hilton.

He was released from captivity on 4 March 1973, after 6 years of captivity and spent much of 1973 attached to Portsmouth Naval Hospital, Portsmouth, Virginia. When McDaniel returned home from Vietnam, he was awarded the Navy's second highest award for bravery, the Navy Cross. Among his other military decorations are two Silver Stars, the Legion of Merit with Combat "V", the Distinguished Flying Cross, three Bronze Stars with Combat "V", and two Purple Hearts for wounds received while in captivity.

Under his command, Lexington experienced no serious accidents while accomplishing more than 20,000 carrier landings. While Captain McDaniel was commander of the Lexington, Gerard Bianco was commissioned by the Navy to go aboard and paint the most exciting thing he found. The portrait hangs in the National Museum of the United States Navy in Washington, D.C.

McDaniel served as Director of Navy/Marine Corps Liaison to the United States House of Representatives from 1979 to 1981. In this capacity, Captain McDaniel worked daily with Congress on national defense planning and provided legislators with information vital to the strategic development of Navy forces throughout the world. He retired from the Navy 6 January 1982.

Post-Navy Career 
McDaniel subsequently became involved in the Vietnam War POW/MIA issue, leading to a "grassroots campaign to focus attention on American servicemen still missing in Southeast Asia."

In 1982, McDaniel ran on the Republican ticket against Democratic incumbent Charles Orville Whitley to represent North Carolina's 3rd congressional district. McDaniel was defeated 63% to 36% in that election.

In 1988, McDaniel went on a speaking tour of US Navy commands to encourage military personnel to register to vote and discussing his experiences as a POW.

McDaniel was President of the American Defense Institute, a non-profit organization headquartered in Washington, D.C. He founded ADI to increase public awareness of the need for a strong national defense.

In 2010, McDaniel was on a speaking tour for US Navy officers and also speaking at returning soldier and sailor workshops.

Awards and honors 
 Navy Cross for his time in captivity 14–29 June 1969.
 2x Silver Star one for 21 to 24 May 1967 and a second for September 1967.
 2x Legion of Merit one with  Combat "V" for his time in captivity and one without for his service as Director of the House of Representatives Office of Legislative Affairs from December 1978 through June 1981.
 Distinguished Flying Cross for heroism and extraordinary achievement while participating in aerial flight on 10 April 1967.
 8x Air Medal (Individual)
 4x Air Medal (Strike/Flight)
 3x Bronze Star Medal with Combat "V"
 2x Purple Heart
 Prisoner of War Medal, 19 May 1967 – 4 March 1973.
 American Patriots Medal, from the Freedoms Foundation of Valley Forge, Pennsylvania, February 1979.

Navy Cross Citation 

For his actions in captivity from 14–29 June 1969 he received the Navy Cross with the following citation:

Bibliography

References

External links 

1931 births
Living people
People from Kinston, North Carolina
People from Virginia Beach, Virginia
Campbell University alumni
Elon University alumni
United States Naval Aviators
Vietnam War prisoners of war

Recipients of the Navy Cross (United States)
Recipients of the Legion of Merit
Recipients of the Silver Star
Recipients of the Distinguished Flying Cross (United States)